Iraqis in the United Arab Emirates have a population exceeding 100,000, closer estimates report a total of 150,000 Iraqis in the Emirates. Since its independence, Iraqis have contributed in the development of UAE, as engineers, politicians and in other fields. Most notably Adnan Pachachi who was appointed as Minister of State in the first Government of the Emirate of Abu Dhabi. Pachachi is known for his role in submitting the UAE's application for membership in the United Nations. In a meeting with Prime Minister of Iraq, Mustafa Al-Kadhimi, Mohamed bin Zayed Al Nahyan stated that "Iraqis have contributed in building the UAE, and there are many of them who worked, built, developed and helped build the Emirates, and we mention this credit to them, whether engineers, doctors, or even politicians and others. There are still many Iraqis living in the UAE, and they are credited.”

The Iraqi people tend to be spread out over various emirates of the country, with areas of high concentration being Abu Dhabi and Dubai.

Background 
Early migration of Iraqi people to the Emirates began after Abdul Salam Arif's 1968 Arab nationalist revolution in Baghdad which resulted in a high influx of Iraqis moving their businesses to Dubai and continued to do so during the 1970s, as well as throughout the Iran–Iraq War, the first Gulf war and the further ongoing civil unrest in Iraq due to the 2003 invasion of Iraq.

The majority of Iraqi expatriates that fled to the UAE are educated and affluent peoples who are now active in Emirati society, from being engineers to teachers and jewellers, as well as being involved in business and the media as presenters and news anchors.

Economic contributions 
There are 500 Iraqi companies operating in the Jebel Ali Free Zone alone, an economic hub located in Jebel Ali, a city in Dubai.

Iraqi people in the United Arab Emirates
 Rosil Al Azawi, television presenter and model born in Sharjah
 Sophia Jawad, actress and model
 Ali Abu Khumra, television director
 Narcy, rapper born in Dubai
 Zeena Zaki, fashion designer based in Dubai

See also 
 Iraq–United Arab Emirates relations
 Adnan Pachachi

References

Arabs in the United Arab Emirates
Emirati people of Iraqi descent
 
United Arab Emirates
Ethnic groups in the United Arab Emirates
Iraq–United Arab Emirates relations